Toon may refer to:

Places 
 Tōon, Ehime, a Japanese city in Ehime Prefecture
 Toon, the former name of Ferdows, a city in South Khorasan Province, Iran
 Toon, Somaliland, a town in the Garoodi region

People 
 Toon (name), a list of people with the given name, nickname or surname

Arts and entertainment
 Toon (TV series), a 2016 Dutch television series 
 Toon (role-playing game), published by Steve Jackson Games
 Toon, a term in the film Who Framed Roger Rabbit (1988) for cartoon characters
 Toon, a shortened name for cartoon animation

Businesses
 Cartoon Network, an animation-oriented cable television network, sometimes abbreviated to Toon
 Toon Books an American comic book publisher
 Toon Studio, Disneyland Paris

Other uses
 Toon, trees of the genus Toona
 A nickname for Newcastle upon Tyne based on the local dialect pronunciation of the word "town"
 A nickname for Newcastle United F.C.

See also 

 Toon Disney, a former pay TV channel
 Toon Express Group, a Hong Kong entertainment company
 Tōon-ryū, a style of karate
 Toonz
 Tune (disambiguation)